Callidrepana gelidata is a moth of the family Drepanidae. It is found in Borneo, Peninsular Malaysia, Singapore, Sumatra, Java, Burma and India.

References

Drepaninae
Moths described in 1863